Sisters of Notre Dame  may refer to:

Congregation of Notre Dame de Montreal
School Sisters of Notre Dame
Sisters of Notre Dame de Namur
Sisters of Notre Dame of Coesfeld